Chao'an Station is a metro station on the Guangzhou Metro's Guangfo Line (FMetro Line 1). It is located underground at the junction of Zhaoxiang Road and North Chao'an Road in the Chancheng District of Foshan.

The station is surrounded by textile and cotton factories and is near the Huanshi Children's Garments Trade Centre, China's largest children garment trade centre. It was completed on 3November 2010.

Station layout

Exits

References

Foshan Metro stations
Railway stations in China opened in 2010
Guangzhou Metro stations